Brendan DuBois is an American mystery fiction and suspense writer who has twice won a Shamus Award for Best Short Story of the Year. He also had his short story "The Dark Snow'" published in Best American Mystery Stories of the Century, edited by Otto Penzler and Tony Hillerman. Despite success in those primary genres, he is best known for his alternate history novel Resurrection Day, which won the Sidewise Award for Alternate History. He was the champion on the September 28, 2012 episode of Jeopardy! and defeated the Beast on the February 24, 2015 episode of The Chase.

Bibliography

Novels
 Resurrection Day (1998)
 Six Days (2001)
 Betrayed (2003)
 Final Winter (2006)
 Twilight (aka Dead of Night) (2007)
 Amerikan Eagle (written as Alan Glenn) (2011)
Night Road (2016)
The Negotiator (2018)
The First Lady (2018)
The Cornwalls Are Gone (2019) written with James Patterson
Blow Back (2022) written with James Patterson

Lewis Cole series
Dead Sand (1994)
Black Tide (1995)
Shattered Shell (1999)
Killer Waves (2001)
Buried Dreams (2004)
Primary Storm (2006)
Deadly Cove (2011)
Fatal Harbor (2014)
Blood Foam (2015)
Storm Cell (2016)
Hard Aground (2018)

Empire of the North series (e-Books)
The Noble Warrior (2012)
The Noble Prisoner (2012)
The Noble Prince (2012)

Dark Victory series
 Dark Victory (2015)
 Red Vengeance (2017)
 Black Triumph (2018)

Short fiction 
Collections
 
  This collection includes the story Necessary Brother for which DuBois won the Shamus Award for best PI short story in 1995
 
 
 
Stories

References

External links
 
 
 
 Brendan DuBois at Book Series in Order

Living people
American male novelists
American mystery writers
Asimov's Science Fiction people
Barry Award winners
Jeopardy! contestants
Sidewise Award winners
Year of birth missing (living people)